Saparevo Glacier is a  long and  wide glacier draining the northwest slopes of Imeon Range on Smith Island, South Shetland Islands, Antarctica. It is situated northeast of Kongur Glacier, and flows north-northeast of Mount Christi and southwest of Matochina Peak into Vedena Cove in Drake Passage. Bulgarian early mapping in 2009. The glacier is named after the settlement of Saparevo in Southwestern Bulgaria.

See also
 List of glaciers in the Antarctic
 Glaciology

Maps
Chart of South Shetland including Coronation Island, &c. from the exploration of the sloop Dove in the years 1821 and 1822 by George Powell Commander of the same. Scale ca. 1:200000. London: Laurie, 1822.
  L.L. Ivanov. Antarctica: Livingston Island and Greenwich, Robert, Snow and Smith Islands. Scale 1:120000 topographic map. Troyan: Manfred Wörner Foundation, 2010.  (First edition 2009. )
 South Shetland Islands: Smith and Low Islands. Scale 1:150000 topographic map No. 13677. British Antarctic Survey, 2009.
 Antarctic Digital Database (ADD). Scale 1:250000 topographic map of Antarctica. Scientific Committee on Antarctic Research (SCAR). Since 1993, regularly upgraded and updated.
 L.L. Ivanov. Antarctica: Livingston Island and Smith Island. Scale 1:100000 topographic map. Manfred Wörner Foundation, 2017.

References
 Saparevo Glacier SCAR Composite Antarctic Gazetteer
 Bulgarian Antarctic Gazetteer. Antarctic Place-names Commission. (details in Bulgarian, basic data in English)

External links
 Saparevo Glacier. Copernix satellite image

Glaciers of Smith Island (South Shetland Islands)
Bulgaria and the Antarctic